The 2018–19 Süper Lig, officially called the Spor Toto Süper Lig Lefter Küçükandonyadis season, was the 61st season of the Süper Lig, the highest tier football league of Turkey. The season began on 10 August 2018 and concluded in May 2019.

The season was named after Lefter Küçükandonyadis, a former Turkish national team player and Fenerbahçe legend.

This season the VAR was introduced in all games of Süper Lig competition.

Teams
A total of 18 teams contest the league, including 15 sides from the 2017–18 season and three promoted from the 2017–18 TFF First League. It includes Rizespor and Ankaragücü, the two top teams from the TFF First League, and Erzurum BB, the winners of the 2017–18 TFF First League playoffs.
Gençlerbirliği, Osmanlıspor, and Karabükspor were relegated to 2018–19 TFF First League.

Stadiums and locations

Personnel and sponsorship

Managerial changes

League table

Results

Positions by round
The following table represents the teams' positions after each round in the competition.

Statistics

Top goalscorers

Top assists

Hat-tricks

Awards

Annual awards

Team of the Year

References

External links

 

 

Turk
1
Süper Lig seasons